Gayaza High School is the oldest all-girls boarding secondary school covering grades 8 to 13 (Secondary 1 to 6) in Uganda. The school is Church-founded, government-aided and accredited by the Ministry of Education, Science, Technology and Sports.

Location

Gayaza High School covers an area of 104.76 acres on a flat topped ridge with gentle slopes and lies at an average height of 3,800 feet above sea level. To the North it is bordered by Makerere University Agricultural Research Institute, Kabanyolo (University Farm) and in the west by Makenke village separated by the Gayaza – Zirobwe road.

The area to the East between the school farm and the road from Kampala to Kalagi, Mukono is Kyetume Village and to the South the school is bordered by Gayaza Junior School, a parish church and the neighborhood of Gayaza Trading Centre. At this point, the main road from Kampala forks; one road leading to Kalagi in Mukono District and the other to National Crops Resources Research Institute (NaCRRI) in Namulonge, and on to Ziroobwe.

The lane between the two roads leading up to the school, past the primary day schools and the parish church, is a cul de sac, which accounts for the school's relative security in times of trouble.

Gayaza High School lies between coordinates 0°27'36.0"N and 32°36'39.0"E (Latitude: 0.460000; Longitude: 32.610833).

History
Christian missionaries belonging to the Church Missionary Society of England founded Gayaza High School on the land that was donated to the Church by Kabaka Daudi Cwa II (King of Buganda) in January 1905 with 4 pioneer students and hence becoming Uganda's first girls’ boarding school.

The purpose of the school's establishment was to train girls, especially the daughters of chiefs of the Kingdom of Buganda, in those skills that would make them better wives but his was only a basis of security approval from the traditional leaders of that time. The founders however had a different motive: to educate girls based on a strong Christian foundation. They realized that the best way of entrenching Christianity was by having Christian mothers under whom children spent all their formative years.

In the beginning, the school's curriculum included agriculture, handiwork, child-care and needlework, as well as scripture, reading, writing, arithmetic and geography.

Gayaza High School was built on a 140-acre of land, with 3 houses; Kikko, Kyawakati and Manga. Its Motto was "Banno" (friends). The girls initially put on a "suuka" (bed-sheet) for the school uniform although this was modified into a uniform with a Victorian dress top, akin to the current Baganda traditional dress ‘bodingi’ (Gomesi). Later. Alfreda Allen (the founding headmistress) designed a new uniform with a round-neck, with short Magyar sleeves, an embroidered badge and different colours used to distinguish classes.

In 1939, the informal senior secondary section began but later in 1962, it was decided to separate the secondary school from the junior school. Gayaza Junior School retained the old premises on the eastern side, while the secondary school retaining the original name of Gayaza High School found home on the western wing. When they separated, Gayaza Junior School changed its motto from "Banno" and started sharing Gayaza High School's motto: "Never Give Up". As a result, from 1963 Ms. Hill became the Junior School's headmistress while Ms. Joan Cox was the secondary school's head teacher.

From 4 girls, the twin-schools have gone on to become two of Uganda's academic giants, increasing enrollment at both schools to more than 1,000 pupils and students respectively.

Originally, any girl, as long as she was a daughter of a chief in the Buganda Kingdom, was admitted to Gayaza but later, even those from rich families were able to join the school. Eventually the system changed further so that one had to pass their written examinations to get into Gayaza. Today this is still the practice.

Current status 
Gayaza High School (GHS) is a Church of Uganda founded and Government-aided girls’ boarding secondary school that offers both Arts and Sciences and a number of co-curricular activities.

The school has both the Ordinary and Advanced levels of education whose focus is on holistic development of an entire human being and follows the National Curriculum that is assessed by the Uganda National Examinations Board (UNEB).

Governance and management

Governance 
The Board of Governors is the governing body of the school and is constituted as provided for by the Education Board of Governors regulations, section 59 part (ii) of the Education Act, 2008. It consists of about 15 people representing all the major stake holders namely; foundation body, parents, teachers, non-teaching staff, local government and Alumni.

Management 
The day-to-day management of the school is headed by the Head teacher (headmistress) who is supported by two deputies and a Director of Studies. There are three Deans [i.e. a dean of the Lower school (Secondary 1 and 2), a dean of the Middle school, (Secondary 3 and 4), and a dean of the Upper school (Secondary 5 and 6)]: a senior woman, a senior man and a senior house mistress who support the management of the school. The responsibilities of the respective management staff are listed in the Gayaza High School Human Resource Manual.

Headmistresses

Alfreda Allen (Founding Headmistress 1905–1930) 
Alfreda Allen was the first headmistress of Gayaza in 1905. Sent by the Church Missionary Society (CMS) to fast-track girls' education in the country, she arrived in Buganda with Janet Smith, later followed by Dorothy Allan, Nancy Corby and Irene Steintz to start the school. In 1904, under the reign of Kabaka Daudi Cwa II; Sir Apollo Kaggwa, a in chief in Buganda, requested the England-based Church Missionary Society to open a girls' school at Gayaza although this was resisted at first because the then Chiefs were not willing to pay for girls' education. These fears were however swept aside when a CMS ladies' conference, convened in England, resolved that a girls' school be started near the Gayaza mission land, which was donated by the King. Prior to this, there had been a few boys' schools, while the girls were only receiving church instruction in the scriptures and catechism in preparation for baptism. In recognition of her memorable work, the school chapel (Alfreda Allen chapel) was named after her.

Joan Cox (1950–1972) 
Ms. Joan Cox came to Gayaza High School in 1938 under the auspices of the Church Missionary Society (CMS) and served as Headmistress of Gayaza High School for 22 years. She did a lot to ensure development and excellence at Gayaza High School. It was during her time that the School Chapel, Library and Administration block were built. Her wise leadership also led to the establishment of the School farm and the success of the farm diet scheme. One of the dormitories (Cox) in the school has been named after her. Ms. Cox's influence reached all corners of Uganda and has influenced the education of Uganda's girl-child. She lived to be 100 and died on a fateful Saturday 14 April 2012.

Sheelagh Warren (1972–1990) 
Sheelagh Warren was Headmistress of Gayaza High School for 18 years. She took over from Miss Joan Cox when she left, having overseen the development of the secondary school to O' and A' levels, the construction of most of the permanent buildings and the establishment of the school's reputation for academic excellence, and more. Warren steered the school through Uganda's most turbulent times - through the 1979 war that toppled Idi Amin, the five-year National Resistance Army guerrilla war that brought NRM into power in 1986. Despite the insecurity and scarcity of the times, the school continued to run successfully. Ms. Warren turned 90 in November 2017 and the Warren Computer Center/Laboratory at Gayaza is named after her.

Ruth Nvumetta Kavuma (1990–2002) 
"Being the first African headmistress of Gayaza High School and staying there for 11 years was perhaps my greatest achievement" Kavuma writes in one of her memoirs. "The change in leadership was done so well. Ms. Warren had documented every activity in an exercise book which she handed to me, giving all the guidelines of what is done during which months of the year. It proved very helpful to me in terms of having a soft landing as well as maintaining the school standard" she stated. On leaving Gayaza, Kavuma joined politics and served as a Member of Parliament for several years.

Joy Male (2002–2006) 
Joy Male became headmistress of Gayaza High School in August 2002 after Ruth Kavuma left and stayed until April 2006 when she retired from the Civil Service on reaching 60 years of age. She had had a stint as head teacher at Nakasero Secondary School, Mengo Senior School and Makerere College School before she joined Gayaza. One of her challenges was joining as a new staff member yet as head teacher. Under her leadership construction of Rhoda Nsibambi dormitory was completed, construction of the Ruth Nvumetta Kavuma classroom block started and she oversaw several school building renovation projects.

Victoria Kisarale (2009–2019) 
Victoria Sserunkuuma Kisarale, fondly known as Kisa came to Gayaza High School in 1998 as deputy head teacher under Mrs. Ruth Kavuma and later Mrs. Joy Male. In  2009 she was made substantive headteacher and served as so for 10 years until she retired in August 2019. She did a lot to inculcate values in the students with emphasis on the 21st century skills.

It was during her time that the school gate was given a face lift, dining room expanded, swimming pool pavilion constructed and the new administration block started on by the Old Girls. She also saw the school farm flourishing during her time. She has greatly impacted on the education of the girl child and inspired many. She will be fondly remembered by the staff and students she worked with in her era.

Kizito Robinah Katongole (2019–present) 
Robinah, the current head teacher, took office on Thursday - 10 October 2019. Being an Old Girl, she isn't a new face on the Gayaza High School compound. Formerly, a literature teacher for about 17 years before she acted as Deputy Head Teacher under Victoria S. Kisarale. We await what the future holds for the school under her stewardship.

Student residences
Gayaza High School has 8 student dormitories which are named after prominent Ugandans, politicians or after administrators at the school. They include;

Corby House 

Corby house, one of the oldest dormitories in Gayaza High School was named after the Headmistress Nancy Corby, who preceded Joan Cox in 1963. She was the last one to be head of Junior School. Previously Gayaza Junior and Gayaza High School were one school, until 1962, when the secondary section was started with Joan Cox as its first headmistress.

The house has both the junior and senior blocks. The junior block has 8 rooms, 2 of which are prefects’ rooms while the senior block has 12 rooms and 1 belongs to the sitting house prefect. The residents of this house are known as "Corbians" with Blue as their theme colour. Corby's motto is "Forward Ever, Backward Never".

Cox House 
The dormitory was named after Joan Cox who was Headmistress of Gayaza High School for 22 years. By the early 1970s, most of the modern buildings had been added to the school during Cox's leadership. Cox house (formerly Tulip Tree) and Kivebulaya (formerly Canna Lily) were constructed with funds from The World Bank around 1970. Due to space shortage, students from Cox and Kivebulaya dormitories have traditionally been distributed to other houses when they return for A-level. Today residents of this house are known as "Coxites" and their house theme colour is Maroon.

Ham & Apollo House 
Ham & Apollo House (also casually known as "Ham") was named after two great Buganda chiefs; Sir Apollo Kaggwa and Ham Mukasa who were political pioneers and also promoted education in Uganda. Sir Apollo Kaggwa was Katikkiro of Buganda (1865-1927). Kaggwa under Kabaka Daudi Cwa II in 1904 requested the Church Missionary Society to open a girls' school at Gayaza. Ham Mukasa (1870-1956), served as Secretary to the Katikkiro of Buganda. He contributed to the modernisation of Uganda through introduction of modern education, health, agriculture and Christianity. Members of this house are referred to as "Hamites" and their theme colour is Green.

Hutchinson House 
"Hutch" as usually referred to by the students is located in the middle of the school. It is named after Sir Joseph and Lena Hutchinson who were staff of Namulonge Cotton Research Station that was located a few kilometers from the school. The Hutchinsons worked tirelessly with Pamela Goode, a teacher at the school then, to establish the school farm in 1954. With this establishment, the school started the farm diet scheme in 1955. Hutchinson is the second largest house after Rhoda Nsibambi. Today, members of this house are called "Hutchites" and their theme colour is Purple.

Kennedy House 

Kennedy house was opened in 1964 and named after the President of the United States of America, John F. Kennedy, who was assassinated in 1963 and had vehemently fought for rights of the African-Americans. During the house's construction, the then Gayaza girls wanted to honor him for defending the rights of the black people. Although he had no connection with Uganda, America was already playing a clear role in Uganda, with volunteer teachers and grants for education through USAID.

The motto of Kennedy house is written in Swahili, "Kua Mfano", which means "Be an example". The house's Mascot is an eagle symbolizing the quick minded residents ("Kennedians"). Red is the house theme color and stands for boldness and strength.

Kivebulaya House 
"Kivites" have their house named after Apollo Kivebulaya (1864-1933) who was an outstanding missionary and evangelist of the 19th century. He was baptized in 1895 and became a catechist to the Anglican missionaries. In 1896 he was sent to Boga, in current day Eastern Democratic Republic of Congo, as a missionary, when the chief there requested for a Christian teacher. As a result of how he patiently bore his trials, his testimony won over the people of Boga, and eventually even the then chief converted. Kivebulaya  expanded his ministry to include literacy training. He was ordained a deacon in 1900 and priest in 1903. In 1922, he was named a canon, in recognition of his work which became the core of what in 1972 became a separate diocese, now part of the Church of Christ  – Province of the Anglican Church in the Congo. Kivebulaya died on May 30, 1933. Kivebulaya house (also better known as "Kiv" today) was formerly known as "Canna Lily" and its theme colour is white.

Rhoda Nsibambi House 
"Rhoda", the home of "Rhodesians" is the newest dormitory on the Gayaza High School campus. It was opened when the school celebrated 100 years in 2005. The house is named after the Rhoda Nsibambi; former wife of the past Prime Minister of Uganda, Apolo Nsibambi. She was head girl of the school in 1958, then an influential old girl who served diligently in the education sector and for Gayaza High School as a chairperson of the Parents Teachers Association, and a member of the Board of Governors of the school. She died on in December 2001. The house's theme colour is grey.

Sherborne (Mary Stuart) House 
Sherborne House was named after Sherborne School for Girls in Dorset, UK, who used to offer Gayaza High School grants and service for many years in the past. The then Headmistress of the Sherborne School for Girls somehow learned that the Gayaza girls of that time used to go without breakfast. On hearing this, the girls at Sherborne School decided to collect some money for this cause. They further contributed funds to purchase equipment, furniture and bursaries for the girls at Gayaza. Evidently, the table tennis (recreation) room was also built with the money collected in memory of their Head Girl who died in an accident. Girls who reside in Sherborne house are known as "Sherbonites" and the theme colour of their house is yellow.

Mary Stuart, which is the senior section of Sherborne house, was the first tiled dormitory and was named after the wife of Cyril Stuart who was Bishop of Uganda from 1932 to 1952. She was a great advocate of girls' and women's education. Mary Stuart house was first the seniors' dormitory and the then Head Girls and prefects (other than house prefects) before it became the HSC block for Sherborne House. Mary Stuart lived to be 99 years and 364 days old. She died in 2000.

Mehta Library 
In 1962 Mehta library was opened by Mr. Mehta J.B. The library composed of magazines, newspapers, textbooks, and educational literature novels. The students use the library for personal reading, research meetings, and seminars.

Reputation 
In 2009, Gayaza High School was ranked as the 68th best high school in Africa.

Notable alumni

 Princess Elizabeth Bagaaya – Princess, Lawyer, Diplomat, Politician, Model
Nana Kagga - Actress, producer, director, petroleum engineer
 Julia Sebutinde – Presiding Judge, Courtroom II, International Criminal Court, The Hague, Netherlands
 Maggie Kigozi – Physician, businesswoman, sportswoman and farmer. Currently a management consultant at UNIDO. Formerly, Executive Director of Uganda Investment Authority.
 Allen Kagina – Administrator and businesswoman. Commissioner-General of Uganda Revenue Authority from 2004 until 2014.
Bertha Kingori, one of the first women appointed to the Legsislative Council of Tanganyika.
 Maria Kiwanuka – Economist, businesswoman and politician. Former Finance Minter of Uganda (27 May 2011 until 1 March 2015). 
 Margaret Mungherera (25 October 1957 – 4 February 2017) – Former Senior Consultant Psychiatrist, Mulago National Referral Hospital, former President of Uganda Medical Association, former President of World Medical Association (2013 to 2014).
 Grania Rubomboras – Electrical engineer and corporate executive. Regional Project Manager at the Nile Equatorial Lakes Subsidiary Action Program (NELSAP), Interconnection of Electric Grids Project, based in Kigali, Rwanda.
 Monica Azuba Ntege – Civil engineer and politician. Cabinet Minister of Works and Transport in the Cabinet of Uganda, since 6 June 2016.
 Philippa Ngaju Makobore – Ugandan electrical engineer, who serves as the head of the Instrumentation Division at Uganda Industrial Research Institute. 
 Proscovia Margaret Njuki, Ugandan electrical engineer who serves as the chairperson of the board of directors of Uganda Electricity Generation Company Limited.
 Jean Namayega Sseninde, Professional soccer player, with the London Phoenix ladies team, in the English Second League.

See also
Education in Uganda

References

Further reading
Kalemera, Alex M., Gayaza High School In History, 1905–1962 (Kampala, Makerere University Press, 1975)
Gayaza High School The First Ninety Years, (1905-1995) edited by Joan Cox, Brenda Richards and Sheelagh Warren (found in the Gayaza High School Library)

External links
Overview of Gayaza High School In June 2012
Gayaza High School Website



Boarding schools in Uganda
Educational institutions established in 1905
Girls' schools in Uganda
Wakiso District
1905 establishments in Uganda
Schools in Uganda